Stefan Živanović (born 19 February 1989) is a Serbian professional basketball player who last played for Žitko Basket of the Second Basketball League of Serbia.

Professional career 
On August 1 2019, Živanović signed with Kragujevački Radnički, of the Second Men's League of Serbia.

References

External links
 Stefan Živanović at fiba.com
 Stefan Živanović at eurobasket.com
 Stefan Živanović at aba-liga.com

1989 births
Living people
ABA League players
Basketball League of Serbia players
Competitors at the 2013 Mediterranean Games
Larisa B.C. players
Kangoeroes Basket Mechelen players
KK Igokea players
KK FMP (1991–2011) players
KK Beovuk 72 players
KK Radnički FMP players
KK Smederevo players
KK Metalac Valjevo players
KK Vršac players
KK Žitko Basket players
KKK Radnički players
Mediterranean Games medalists in basketball
Mediterranean Games silver medalists for Serbia
Serbian expatriate basketball people in Belgium
Serbian expatriate basketball people in North Macedonia
Serbian expatriate basketball people in Romania
Serbian expatriate basketball people in Switzerland
Serbian men's basketball players
Shooting guards
Basketball players from Belgrade
Universiade bronze medalists for Serbia
Universiade gold medalists for Serbia
Universiade medalists in basketball
Vevey Riviera Basket players
Medalists at the 2011 Summer Universiade
Medalists at the 2013 Summer Universiade